Nura Afia is an American beauty vlogger. In November 2016, CoverGirl cosmetics company named her one of its brand ambassadors. Afia is the CoverGirl's first brand ambassador who wears a hijab.

Early life
Afia grew up in Aurora, Colorado, with five siblings, and attended Smoky Hill High School. Her mother, Anne, was born a Christian in Lebanon to Swiss-Lebanese parents, and converted to Islam prior to marrying Afia's father, who is Moroccan. In 2011, when she was 18, Afia married Asef Noorzai, a childhood friend.

Career
While at home with her first baby in 2011 named Laila Noorzai, Afia began watching beauty videos online. She was inspired to start recording her own videos, using electronics borrowed from family. Over time she grew her channels to reach 213,000 YouTube subscribers and 300,000 Instagram followers. Afia also began to do photo shoots and work with modest fashion brands.

In November 2016, as part of a campaign to feature models from diverse backgrounds, CoverGirl cosmetics named Afia as a brand ambassador. She was the first hijab-wearing model to be a brand ambassador for CoverGirl when she began modeling their new mascara product called "So Lashy! BlastPro." She received many messages of support from Muslim women pleased to see a model in a hijab, however she was also criticised as hypocritical for both covering up with a hijab and seeking attention through make-up.

References

Living people
People from Denver
Video bloggers
Women video bloggers
American Muslims
American women bloggers
American bloggers
1993 births
People from Aurora, Colorado
American make-up artists
American people of Lebanese descent
American people of Swiss descent
American people of Moroccan descent
Female models from Colorado
Beauty and makeup YouTubers
YouTube vloggers
21st-century American women
YouTubers from Colorado